Allison Nelson (March 11, 1822 – October 7, 1862) was the ninth mayor of Atlanta, serving from January until July 1855, when he resigned from office. He died of disease in Prairie County (present-day Lonoke County), Arkansas, during the American Civil War.

Early life
His father, John B. Nelson, was an early DeKalb County settler who operated Nelson's Ferry across the Chattahoochee River until murdered by John W. Davis in 1825.

Political career
In a close election for mayor, Nelson, running as a Democrat, defeated the Know Nothing candidate, Ira O. McDaniel, but resigned in July when the city council reduced a fine he had levied on two young men for destroying city property, thus leaving John Glen as the acting mayor. Nelson left for Kansas during the border disputes, then moved to Meridian, Texas, where he was involved with Indian affairs, serving under Lawrence S. Ross, and in 1860 was elected to the legislature.

Military service and death
During the Mexican–American War, Nelson served as a captain in the Kennesaw Rangers with another future mayor, Cicero C. Hammock, as well as the father of mayor John B. Goodwin – Williamson H. Goodwin. Nelson later served as a brigadier general under General Narciso López, in a failed attempt to free Cuba from Spain. He organized and served as colonel of the 10th Texas Infantry Regiment in the Confederate States Army. He was later promoted brigadier general but contracted typhus and died. He was buried in Mount Holly Cemetery, Little Rock, Arkansas.

Legacy
Camp Nelson Confederate Cemetery (established 1897) in Lonoke County, Arkansas, is named after him.

See also
 List of American Civil War generals
 List of mayors of Atlanta

References
 Eicher, John H., and David J. Eicher, Civil War High Commands. Stanford: Stanford University Press, 2001. .
 Sifakis, Stewart. Who Was Who in the Civil War. New York: Facts On File, 1988. .
 Warner, Ezra J. Generals in Gray: Lives of the Confederate Commanders. Baton Rouge: Louisiana State University Press, 1959. .
 
 Camp Nelson Cemetery
 TDGH - March 11

External links
 
 Birthplace of Allison Nelson historical marker
 Encyclopedia of Arkansas History & Culture entry

1822 births
1862 deaths
19th-century American politicians
American military personnel of the Mexican–American War
Burials at Mount Holly Cemetery
Confederate States Army brigadier generals
Deaths from typhus
Infectious disease deaths in Arkansas
Mayors of Atlanta
Democratic Party members of the Georgia House of Representatives
Democratic Party members of the Texas House of Representatives
People from Fulton County, Georgia
People from DeKalb County, Georgia
People from Meridian, Texas
Military personnel from Texas